"The Morning After" is a 1937 song composed by Tommy Dorsey, Moe Jaffe, and Clay Boland. Tommy Dorsey and His Orchestra released the song as a Victor 78 single in 1937 with Jack Leonard on vocals. 

"The Morning After" was released as a Victor 78, 25703-A, by Tommy Dorsey and His Orchestra in 1937 with "I May Be Wrong But I Think You're Wonderful" as the B side. The song was published by the Standard Music Publications, Inc. in New York.

Other recordings
The song was also recorded by Red Norvo and His Orchestra and was released as a Brunswick 78, 7932, in 1937 featuring Mildred Bailey on vocals. Lennie Hayton and His Orchestra also released a recording of the song on Decca with Paul Barry on vocals.

References

Sources
Peter J. Levinson, Tommy Dorsey: Livin' in a Great Big Way: a Biography (Cambridge, MA: Da Capo Press, 2005)  
Robert L. Stockdale, Tommy Dorsey: On The Side (Metuchen, NJ: The Scarecrow Press, 1995)  
The Jazz Anthology website.
ASCAP database.

External links 
 Online version of the 1937 Tommy Dorsey recording on Victor.

Tommy Dorsey songs
1937 songs
Songs written by Clay Boland
Songs written by Moe Jaffe
Songs written by Tommy Dorsey